Van der Giessen is a Dutch surname. Notable people with the surname include:

Ada van der Giessen (born 1948), Dutch chess master
John van der Giessen (born 1982), American rugby union player
Piet Jan van der Giessen (1918–1993), Dutch sailor

See also
Van der Giessen de Noord, a Dutch shipyard

Dutch-language surnames